Frank Bramley RA (6 May 1857 – 9 August 1915) was an English post-impressionist genre painter of the Newlyn School.

Personal life
Bramley was born in Sibsey, near Boston, in Lincolnshire to Charles Bramley from Fiskerton also in Lincolnshire.

From 1873 to 1878 Bramley studied at the Lincoln School of Art. He then studied from 1879 to 1882 at the Royal Academy of Fine Arts in Antwerp, where Charles Verlat was his instructor. He lived in Venice from 1882 to 1884 and then moved to Newlyn, Cornwall.

Bramley married fellow artist Katherine Graham, daughter of John Graham from Huntingstile, Grasmere, Westmoreland, in 1891.  The couple lived at Orchard Cottage, which at the time was called Belle Vue Cottage, from 1893 to 1897. In 1895 they moved to Droitwich in the West Midlands. They lived at Bellue Vue House in 1889 and by 1900 had settled at Grasmere in the Lake District.

Bramley died in Chalford Hill, Gloucestershire in August 1915.

Career
Having returned to England from Venice in or after 1884, Bramley established himself in the Newlyn School artist colony on Rue des Beaux Arts in Newlyn. Along with Walter Langley and Stanhope Forbes, he was considered to be one of the "leading figures" of the Newlyn School.

In contrast to other members of the Newlyn school, Bramley specialised in interiors and worked on combining natural and artificial light in his paintings, such as A Hopeless Dawn.

During his time in Newlyn, Bramley was a particular exponent of the ‘square brush technique’, using the flat of a square brush to lay the paint on the canvas in a jigsaw pattern of brush strokes, giving a particular vibrancy to the paint surface. In the early 1890s, his palette became brighter and his handling of the paint looser and more impastoed, while his subject matter narrowed to portraits and rural genre paintings.

An example of Bramley's use of the square brush technique is his painting Domino!

His A Hopeless Dawn (1888) is held by the Tate Gallery, London after having been purchased for the nation by the Chantrey Bequest and is one of Bramley's most favored works. Praised by the Royal Academy, Penlee House also appreciate this Bramley work: "The painting’s strong emotional and narrative content, together with its aesthetic appeal and tonal harmony, make this one of the most admired Newlyn School works to this day." The young grieving woman in the painting, artist model Effy Reynolds James. The painting was referenced in an April 2010 General Conference address by President of the Church of Jesus Christ of Latter-day Saints, Thomas S. Monson.

Bramley was one of the founders of the New English Art Club, but left the organization after having received condemning comments from Walter Sickert.

In 1894 Bramley became an Associate of the Royal Academy (ARA) and in 1911 he became a Royal Academician (RA). He was also a gold medal winner at the Paris Salon.

Exhibitions
 1884 - 1912: Royal Academy
 1890: Domino, Dowdeswell Exhibition

Works
Selected paintings include:

 A Venetian Market Girl, 1883.
 Primrose Day, 1885.
 Everyone His Own Tale, 1885.
 Domino, 1886.
 Eyes and No Eyes, 1887.
 A Hopeless Dawn, 1888.
 Saved, 1889.
 For of Such is the Kingdom of Heaven, 1891.
 Old Memories, 1892.
 After Fifty Years, 1893.
 Sleep, A Portrait of Mrs. Bolitho, 1895.
 After the Storm, 1896.
 Friends, 1907.

Gallery

Notes

References

Further reading
 Caroline Fox; Francis Greenacre; Barbican Art Gallery. Painting in Newlyn, 1880-1930. Barbican Art Gallery; 1985.

External links

 
Frank Bramley online (ArtCyclopedia)
Frank Bramley - short biography (Artfact)

19th-century English painters
English male painters
20th-century English painters
British genre painters
People from Sibsey
Post-impressionist painters
Royal Academicians
Newlyn School of Artists
1857 births
1915 deaths
Royal Academy of Fine Arts (Antwerp) alumni
People from Grasmere (village)
20th-century English male artists
19th-century English male artists